Shotgun Wedding is a 1993 Australian film based on the Wally Melish siege. Directed by Paul Harmon, it stars Aden Young and Zoe Carides.

References

External links

Shotgun Wedding at Oz Movies

Australian crime drama films
1993 films
Australian films based on actual events
1990s English-language films
1990s Australian films